Raukleiv (Raudkleiv) was a ski jumping hill located near Asenvegen in Seljord, Norway opened in 1886. It was reopened for short period of time in 1975, and the again completely abandoned.

Nowadays this is a new modern all round ski resort with large investments in the last decade. It consists of ski slopes, ski jumping hills and biathlon stadium, all light coated.

History 
On 24 February 1886, premiere Siljordsskirendet ski competition took place, when Johannes Nordgården, soldier from Norway fell at world record distance at 27 metres (89 ft).

Later that day Olaf Bergland, also from Norway, landed at 25.5 metres (84 ft) and set a new official world record distance in ski jumping.

Ski jumping world records

 Not recognized! Fall at world record distance.

References

External links 
 Raukleiv (Raudkleiv) skisprungschanzen.com

Ski jumping venues in Norway
1886 establishments in Norway
Sport in Vestfold og Telemark
Seljord